The following is a list of North Dakota Commissioners of Agriculture and Labor from 1889 to 1966 when the office was split into two entities; the North Dakota Agriculture Commissioner and the North Dakota Labor Commissioner.

 George E. Adams won the 1892 election, but did not qualify for the office, so Nelson Williams was appointed to the position instead.

See also
List of Agriculture Commissioners of North Dakota

Notes

Government of North Dakota
Agriculture